The Archdiocese of Toronto is a Roman Catholic archdiocese that includes part of the Province of Ontario. Its archbishop is also the ecclesiastical provincial for the dioceses of Hamilton,  London, Saint Catharines, and Thunder Bay. The Archbishop is Francis Leo, appointed in February 2023.

Mass is celebrated within the Archdiocese of Toronto in 36 ethnic and linguistic communities every week making the Archdiocese one of the most ethnically diverse Catholic dioceses in the world.

Overall the Archdiocese of Toronto is the largest in Canada.

History
The diocese was created on December 17, 1841 out of the Roman Catholic Archdiocese of Kingston and covered the western half of Upper Canada. Bishop Michael Power was appointed as the first Bishop. For a complete history, see the Archdiocese History website.

In the 1840s, the major challenge was the huge unexpected influx of very poor immigrants, mostly Irish escaping the Great Famine. The fear was that Protestants might use their material needs as a wedge for evangelization. In response the Church built a network of charitable institutions such as hospitals, schools, boarding homes, and orphanages, to meet the need and keep people inside the faith. The church was less successful in dealing with tensions between the French and the Irish Catholic clergy; eventually the Irish took control.

Irish Catholics arriving in Toronto faced widespread intolerance and severe discrimination, both social and legislative, leading to several large scale riots between Catholics and Protestants from 1858–1878, culminating in the Jubilee Riots of 1875. The Irish population essentially defined the Catholic population in Toronto until 1890, when German and French Catholics were welcomed to the city by the Irish, but the Irish proportion still remained 90% of the Catholic population. However, various powerful initiatives such as the foundation of St. Michael's College in 1852 (where Marshall McLuhan was to hold the chair of English until his death in 1980), three hospitals, and the most significant charitable organizations in the city (the Society of St. Vincent de Paul) and House of Providence created by Irish Catholic groups strengthened the Irish identity, transforming the Irish presence in the city into one of influence and power.

McGowan argues that between 1890 and 1920, the city's Catholics experienced major social, ideological, and economic changes that allowed them to integrate into Toronto society and shake off their second-class status. The Irish Catholics (in contrast to the French) strongly supported Canada's role in the First World War. They broke out of the ghetto and lived in all of Toronto's neighbourhoods. Starting as unskilled labourers, they used high levels of education to move up and were well represented among the lower middle class. Most dramatically, they intermarried with Protestants at an unprecedented rate.

It was raised from a diocese to an archdiocese in 1898, which created the ecclesiastical province of Toronto, which included the suffragan dioceses of Hamilton,  London, Saint Catharines, and Thunder Bay.

As of 2015, the archdiocese has 221 parishes and 24 missions. 393 active diocesan priests and 405 religious priests serve 2,066,440 Catholics. There are also 43 brothers, 560 sisters and 136 permanent deacons.

The archdiocese's motto, Quis ut Deus?, means "Who is like God?" — the literal meaning of the name "Michael," the saint to whom the diocese's cathedral is dedicated.

On March 19, 2019, the Ontario Court of Appeal allowed a former altar boy to proceed with suing the Archdiocese of Toronto on grounds related to sex abuse.

Geography

The Archdiocese of Toronto covers a geographic region of the Great Lakes area, which stretches from the shores of Lake Ontario north to Georgian Bay. The area is some 13,000 square kilometres, containing intensely urban and suburban regions and also small cities, towns and rural areas.

The Archdiocese of Toronto includes the City of Toronto, the most populous metropolis in the country and the growing regional municipalities of Peel, York and Durham that surround the City. As the regional municipalities expand, the northern section of the Archdiocese, Simcoe County, is also experiencing notable suburban growth.

The archdiocese is divided into four pastoral regions, each overseen by an auxiliary bishop, comprising 14 pastoral zones. The four pastoral regions which divide the Archdiocese are the Central, Northern, Eastern and Western Regions. The zones are made up of parishes within a geographical boundary.

Diocesan and other Bishops

 Archbishop Francis Leo

Auxiliary Bishops
Bishop John Boissonneau – responsible for the Northern Pastoral Region
Bishop Vincent Nguyen – responsible for the Eastern Pastoral Region
Bishop Robert Kasun – responsible for the Central Pastoral Region
Bishop Ivan Camilleri – responsible for the Western Pastoral Region

Coadjutor Bishops
 John Joseph Lynch, C.M. (1859–1860)
 Philip Francis Pocock (1961–1971)
 Aloysius Matthew Ambrozic (1986–1990); future Cardinal

Former Archbishops
 Thomas Christopher Collins (2007–2023)

Former Auxiliary Bishops
 Timothy O'Mahony (1879–1892)
 Benjamin Webster (1946–1954), appointed Bishop of Peterborough, Ontario
 Francis Allen (1954–1977)
 Francis Marrocco (1955–1968), appointed Bishop of Peterborough, Ontario
 Thomas Fulton (1968–1978), appointed Bishop of Saint Catharines, Ontario
 Aloysius Matthew Ambrozic (1976–1986), appointed Coadjutor here; future Cardinal
 Leonard Wall (1979–1992)
 Michael Pearse Lacey (1979–1993)
 Robert Clune (1979–1995)
 John Knight (1992–2002)
 Nicola De Angelis, C.F.I.C. (1992–2002), appointed Bishop of Peterborough, Ontario
 Terrence Prendergast, S.J. (1995–1998), appointed Bishop of Halifax, Nova Scotia
 R. Anthony Meagher (1997–2002), appointed Archbishop of Kingston, Ontario
 Richard Grecco (2002–2009), appointed Bishop of Charlottetown, Prince Edward Island
 Daniel Bohan (2003–2005), appointed Archbishop of Regina, Saskatchewan
 Peter Hundt (2009–2011), appointed Bishop of Corner Brook and Labrador, Newfoundland
 William McGrattan (2009–2014), appointed Bishop of Peterborough, Ontario
 Wayne Kirkpatrick (2012–2019), appointed Bishop of Antigonish, Nova Scotia

Other priests of this diocese who became Bishops
 Francis Carroll, appointed Bishop of Calgary in 1935
 John Aloysius O′Mara, appointed Bishop of Thunder Bay in 1976

Churches

Toronto
Chinese Martyrs Catholic Church
Our Lady of Lourdes, Toronto
Saint Fidelis Catholic Church
St. Michael's Cathedral, Toronto
St. Agnes, Toronto
St. Basil's Church, Toronto
St. Clare's Church, Toronto
St. Francis of Assisi, Toronto
St. Helen's, Brockton
St. Mary's Church (Toronto)
St. Paul's Basilica
St. Patrick's Church, Toronto
St. Peter's Church, Toronto
Holy Martyrs of Japan, Bradford
Holy Family, Bolton
Holy Family, Parkdale
Holy Rosary Church, Forest Hill
St. Elizabeth Seton (Newmarket)
St. Vincent de Paul, Roncesvalles
St. Pius X, Bloor West
St. Leo's, Mimico
St. Mark, Humber Bay
St. Teresa, New Toronto
Christ the King, Long Branch
St. Ambrose, Alderwood
Holy Angels, Queensway
Our Lady of Sorrows, Kingsway
Our Lady of Peace, Six Points
St. Clement, Markland Wood
 Markham, Ontario

Education
 Conseil scolaire catholique MonAvenir
 Dufferin-Peel Catholic District School Board
 Durham Catholic District School Board
 Simcoe Muskoka Catholic District School Board
 Toronto Catholic District School Board
 York Catholic District School Board

Cemeteries
Assumption Catholic Cemetery, Mississauga
Christ the King Catholic Cemetery, Markham
Guardian Angels Catholic Cemetery, Brampton - Proposed
Holy Cross Catholic Cemetery, Markham
Holy Rosary Catholic Cemetery, Markham - Proposed
Mount Hope Catholic Cemetery, Toronto
Queen of Heaven Catholic Cemetery, Vaughan
Resurrection Catholic Cemetery, Whitby
St. Mary's Catholic Cemetery, Barrie
 Unnamed Catholic Cemetery, Bradford - Proposed

References

Bibliography
 Archdiocese of Toronto at CatholicHierarchy.org
 Metropolitan Archdiocese of Toronto at GCatholic.org

External links

 Archdiocese of Toronto: Find a Parish

 
1841 establishments in Canada
Christianity in Toronto
Religious organizations established in 1841
Roman Catholic dioceses and prelatures established in the 19th century